Phillip Andrew Barber (born 10 June 1965) is an English former professional footballer who played as a midfielder.

Career
Born in Tring, Barber played for Aylesbury United, Crystal Palace, Millwall, Plymouth Argyle, Bristol City, Mansfield Town, Fulham, Dover Athletic, Crawley Town, Carshalton Athletic, Dulwich Hamlet, Croydon, Redhill and St. Leonards. With Crystal Palace, Barber played in the 1990 FA Cup Final.

References

1965 births
Living people
English footballers
Aylesbury United F.C. players
Crystal Palace F.C. players
Millwall F.C. players
Plymouth Argyle F.C. players
Bristol City F.C. players
Mansfield Town F.C. players
Fulham F.C. players
Dover Athletic F.C. players
Crawley Town F.C. players
Carshalton Athletic F.C. players
Dulwich Hamlet F.C. players
Croydon F.C. players
Redhill F.C. players
St. Leonards F.C. players
English Football League players
People from Tring
Association football midfielders
FA Cup Final players
Footballers from Hertfordshire